Kord may refer to:

ASV Kord, a Russian anti-materiel rifle
O'Hare International Airport, with ICAO airport code KORD
The Kord machine gun
Kord (Greyhawk), a fictional deity in the Dungeons & Dragons role-playing game
Kurdish people (Kord in Iranian sources)
KORD-FM, a radio station (102.7 FM) licensed to Richland, Washington, United States
Kord, Iran, a village in Golestan Province, Iran
Kord-e Olya, a village in Isfahan Province, Iran
Kord-e Sofla, a village in Isfahan Province, Iran
Rapid Operational Response Unit (KORD), National Police of Ukraine

See also 
 Cord (disambiguation)